Duniya Ka Mela is a 1974 Indian Hindi-language drama film directed by Kundan Kumar. Amitabh Bachchan was the original cast in the lead but he was replaced by Sanjay Khan. This has been captured in the film "Film hi Film".

Cast   
Sanjay Khan   
Rekha 
Bindu
Ranjeet 
Jeevan
Mehmood

Music
Lyrics: Anand Bakshi

References

External links
 

1974 films
1970s Hindi-language films
1974 drama films
Films scored by Laxmikant–Pyarelal